The Esplanade, also known as Esplanade Mall, is a suburban shopping mall located in the New Orleans suburb of Kenner, Louisiana, United States. Its anchors are Dillard's Clearance Center, 3.6.5+ by image, Target, and Regal Cinemas' Regal Grand Esplanade & GPX. Its former anchors are D. H. Holmes, Macy's (the first Macy's in Louisiana), and Mervyn's. It opened in September 1985 and was owned by the Simon Property Group, who acquired it when they acquired the Mills Corporation in 2007. It is now owned by Kohan Retail Investment Group.

History
The mall was built and opened on October 9, 1985. The original owners were Cadillac Fairview. The mall's original anchors were D. H. Holmes, Leon Godchaux, and Mervyn's. A Macy's was added in 1986. The Mills bought it in 2003 and planned to add new retail including two new anchors (Target and Bass Pro Shops), as well as a new movie theater, but the plan fell through as the Mills faced financial difficulties. Dillard's acquired the former D. H. Holmes anchor in 1989, and opened a men's store in the mall after the Godchaux's anchor closed in 1992.

The mall closed in August 2005 after sustaining damage from Hurricane Katrina, reopening by October 2005. In 2006, Macy's closed its store in the Esplanade, but re-opened in October 2008. Mervyn's closed in 2006 and the former Mervyn's anchor sat vacant until 2010. In July 2010, it was announced that the former Mervyn's anchor would be demolished. Since then, a  Target has been built in its place. The new store officially opened July 24, 2011.

In late 2011, Dillard's Men's Store closed, and in February 2012, the other Dillard's location was converted into a clearance center. Closing off the second floor of the store and blocking the second floor mall entrance to Dillard’s.

Macy's closed again in 2017 as part of a nation-wide downsizing.

On October 5, 2020, Cineworld announced it would close all Regal, Cineworld,  Picturehouse Cinemas, and Grand Cinemas locations in the US, UK, Ireland temporarily. The mall as of 2021 owes various back taxes totaling $320,000. While investigating the back taxes, it was found by Jefferson Parish, Louisiana that taxes had been missed on the empty Macy's in 1992, totaling an additional $480,000 owed. Parts of the mall went to tax sale but went unsold, and were taken over by Jefferson Parish. The Esplanade closed due to Hurricane Ida in late 2021 and has not re-opened.

Anchor Stores

Current
Dillard's Clearance Center (1989–present)
Target Corporation (2011–present)
3.6.5+ by image (2016–present, temporarily closed since 2021)

Former
D. H. Holmes (1985–1989)
Leon Godchaux (1985–1992)
Macy's (1986-2006, 2008–2017)
Mervyn's (1985–2006)

References

External links
Official website

In Popular Culture 

 The interior of the mall was heavily featured in Season 1, Episode 11 of the Fox horror comedy Scream Queens.

Shopping malls established in 1985
Defunct shopping malls in the United States
Shopping malls disestablished in 2021
Buildings and structures in Jefferson Parish, Louisiana
Shopping malls in the New Orleans metropolitan area
Kohan Retail Investment Group